The following lists events that happened during 2005 in the Republic of Albania.

Incumbents
 President: Alfred Moisiu 
 Prime Minister: Fatos Nano (until 11 September), Sali Berisha (starting 11 September)

Events

July
 July 3 - Albanians vote in parliamentary elections.

See also
 2005 in Albanian television

References

 
2000s in Albania
Years of the 21st century in Albania